Stonington is a village in Christian County, Illinois, United States. The population was 837 at the 2020 census.

History

2018 tornado
On December 1, 2018, an EF2 tornado struck the western part of the village; there were no injuries or deaths.

Geography
Stonington is located at  (39.637716, -89.191719).

Demographics

As of the 2020 census there were 837 people, 317 households, and 181 families residing in the village. The racial makeup of the village was 93.79% White, 0.36% African American, 0.12% Native American, 0.12% Asian, 0.12% Pacific Islander, 0.24% from other races, and 5.26% from two or more races. Hispanic or Latino of any race were 1.43% of the population.

There were 317 households, out of which 32.18% had children under the age of 18 living with them, 41.96% were married couples living together, 11.04% had a female householder with no husband present, and 42.90% were non-families. 38.49% of all households were made up of individuals, and 17.98% had someone living alone who was 65 years of age or older. The average household size was 2.82 and the average family size was 2.12.

The village's age distribution consisted of 18.9% under the age of 18, 4.2% from 18 to 24, 28.2% from 25 to 44, 27.3% from 45 to 64, and 21.5% who were 65 years of age or older. The median age was 44.3 years. For every 100 females, there were 97.4 males. For every 100 females age 18 and over, there were 98.5 males.

The median income for a household in the village was $56,094, and the median income for a family was $74,531. Males had a median income of $48,750 versus $37,500 for females. The per capita income for the village was $30,187. About 12.2% of families and 8.8% of the population were below the poverty line, including 11.0% of those under age 18 and 17.4% of those age 65 or over.

Notable people

 Roy A. Corzine (1882-1957), Illinois state representative and farmer, was born in Stonington; he served on the board of education for the Stonington Community High School.
 Earl Bunn Fuller (1885-1947), was a pioneering American ragtime and early jazz bandleader, composer and instrumentalist was born in Stonington. Fuller helped to initiate the popularity of jazz in New York City shortly before America's entry into World War I. He also had an ear for talent, and discovered Ted Lewis and Teddy Brown.

References

Villages in Christian County, Illinois
Villages in Illinois